Qaziabad (also Romanized as Qāẕīābād and Qāzīābād) is a village in Sarvestan Rural District, in the Central District of Bavanat County, Fars Province, Iran. At the 2006 census, its population was 227, in 83 families.

References 

Populated places in Bavanat County